Sangari Mach (also Romanized as Sangārī Mach and Sangāry Mach; also known as Kūh-e Mobārak) is a village in Kangan Rural District, in the Central District of Jask County, Hormozgan Province, Iran. At the 2006 census, its population was 205, in 34 families.

References 

Populated places in Jask County